The Story is an English psychedelic folk duo comprising the former Forest member Martin Welham and his son Tom Welham. They write and record melodic songs that range from psychedelic pop to stream-of-consciousness folk and play an array of predominantly acoustic instruments as a backdrop to their blend of vocal harmonies.

Biography
Martin Welham was part of the influential 1960s acid folk trio Forest. In the early 2000s, thirty years after Forest disbanded, he formed the Somerset based band The Story with his son Tom and returned to recording music. Their sound has echoes of Martin's earlier work with authentic psychedelic songwriting at its core.

The band's first release was a 2005 vinyl split album, The Dawn Is Crowned, with Californian freak folk band Whysp on Good Village Records. The Story's side has five broadly acoustic tracks that blend esoteric, dark imagery with powerful vocal harmonies resulting in an unattributable psychedelic air.

In 2006, the band released its first full-length album, Tale Spin, on Sunbeam Records, the first contemporary artists released by the label. This psychedelic folk album features acoustic guitars, keyboards and light percussion combined with airy harmony vocals and wistful melodies.

A follow-up album, Arcane Rising, was released in 2007. A stream of consciousness conceptual song cycle, the album is made up of improvised melodies and acoustic guitar backings augmented by flutes, melody harp, harmonica and hand percussion. Lyrically, the album celebrates life and nature through the changing seasons while questioning religious doctrines and humankind's ecological footprint. Also in 2007, The Story's sinister track "The Wicker Man" appeared on the dark folk compilation album John Barleycorn Reborn on Cold Spring Records.

The band's acclaimed third full-length album, Joy Ride on Memory Lane, was released in 2011 by Rainbow Quartz Records under the band name The Story UK. This confident, hook-laden psychedelic album has a rockier sound than previous releases while continuing to incorporate the duo's warm harmonies and highly melodic aesthetic. Cold Spring Records' 2011 dark folk compilation album, John Barleycorn Reborn: Rebirth, included The Story's ritualistic celebration piece "All Hallow's Eve".

In 2018, the psychedelic folk rock release, The Dawn is Crowned with Opium Tears, brought together the first ever digital release of the band's 2005 vinyl LP, with five esoteric, darkly oblique, progressive psychedelic rock songs.

Discography

Split album

The Dawn Is Crowned

Studio albums

Tale Spin

Arcane Rising

Joy Ride on Memory Lane

The Dawn is Crowned with Opium Tears

Reception

The Dawn Is Crowned
The Story's contribution to the split vinyl LP The Dawn Is Crowned was described by Doug Mosurak of Dusted as "panoptic in scope and fairly timeless, interjecting frills and fantasy elements into solid, warm musicianship", while The Unbroken Circle'''s Mark Coyle described the song "Road To Ascension" as "a masterpiece of any era" and the vocal harmonies as "incredible with an un-attributable psychedelic air".

Tale Spin
Jeff Penczak of Foxy Digitalis described Tale Spin as "a whistful collection of melodic folk pop full of gorgeous harmonies" while Psychedelic Folk's Gerald Van Waes noted the "warm, delicate beautiful harmony vocals, simple guitars and percussion" making it "a beautiful album and another winner for true and truthful acid folk collectors".

Joy Ride on Memory LaneJoy Ride on Memory Lane received positive reviews. For PopMatters, Stephen Haag described the album as "Utterly Charming" and noted that the duo "definitely have near-encyclopedic knowledge of the Britfolk/psych genre". Shindig! magazine's Pat Curran described the songs as "highly melodic, warm and inviting" and commented that the album "bears repeated listening and comes highly recommended". Uncut magazine's Rob Young said the father and son "make a hugely sympathetic pairing" and that the album "combines the best elements of Brit folk-rock's heyday".

The TimeLarks
In 2011, Martin and Tom began performing as part of the folk trio The TimeLarks and appeared at the 2012 International Pop Overthrow festival at the Cavern Club in Liverpool. In 2016, they released two progressive acoustic folk albums, Wheel of Stone and Grain of Light''.

References

External links
 
 

Psychedelic folk groups
Family musical groups
British folk rock groups